Framed is a 1930 American pre-Code crime action film, directed by George Archainbaud, based on a screenplay by Paul Schofield and Wallace Smith. It starred Evelyn Brent, William Holden (no relation to the Oscar-winning actor, William Holden), Regis Toomey, and Ralf Harolde.

Plot summary
When Rose Manning's father is killed during a robbery by Inspector McArthur, Manning vows to avenge his death. Five years elapse, and Rose is now the hostess of a nightclub, and her liquor supplier, the bootlegger Chuck Gaines is interested in her. Still plotting her revenge, she meets Jimmy McArthur, who she does not realize is the son of the inspector. Spurning Gaines' advances, Rose becomes romantically involved with Jimmy. Her motivations waver as her emotional attachment to the young McArthur grows, until her relationship takes precedence over her revenge.

Chuck, jealous of the growing relationship between Rose and Jimmy, plots with his cohort, Bing Murdock, to murder both the inspector and his son. Uncovering the plan, Rose is attempting to warn Jimmy, when his father raids her club. In the ensuing chaos, Jimmy kills Gaines in order to protect Rose, after Gaines attacked her in a fit of jealous rage.  When the inspector finally realizes that what Rose and Jimmy have is real affection for one another, he removes any objections over their relationship.

Cast

References

External links
 
 
 
 
 

1930 films
1930s crime action films
American crime action films
American black-and-white films
Films directed by George Archainbaud
RKO Pictures films
1930s English-language films
1930s American films